Arch of Trajan may refer to:
Arch of Trajan (Ancona), Italy
Arch of Trajan (Benevento), Italy
Arch of Trajan (Canosa), Italy
Arch of Trajan (Mactaris), Maktar, Tunisia
Arch of Trajan (Mérida), Spain
Arch of Trajan (Rome), Italy
Arch of Trajan (Timgad), Algeria